The 1962–63 NCAA University Division men's basketball season began in December 1962, progressed through the regular season and conference tournaments, and concluded with the 1963 NCAA University Division basketball tournament championship game on March 23, 1963, at Freedom Hall in Louisville, Kentucky. The Loyola-Chicago Ramblers won their first NCAA national championship with a 60–58 victory in overtime over the Cincinnati Bearcats.

Season headlines 

 The Western Athletic Conference began play, with six charter members.
 The Metropolitan New York Conference disbanded at the end of the season after 24 seasons of competition.

Season outlook

Pre-season polls 

The Top 10 from the AP Poll and the Top 20 from the UPI Coaches Poll during the pre-season.

Conference membership changes

Regular season

Conference winners and tournaments

Informal championships

Statistical leaders

Post-season tournaments

NCAA tournament

Final Four 

 Third Place – Duke 85, Oregon State 63

National Invitation tournament

Semifinals & finals 

 Third Place – Marquette 66, Villanova 58

Awards

Consensus All-American teams

Major player of the year awards 

 Helms Player of the Year: Art Heyman, Duke
 Associated Press Player of the Year:Art Heyman, Duke
 UPI Player of the Year: Art Heyman, Duke
 Oscar Robertson Trophy (USBWA): Art Heyman, Duke
 Sporting News Player of the Year: Art Heyman, Duke

Major coach of the year awards 

 Henry Iba Award: Ed Jucker, Cincinnati
 NABC Coach of the Year: Ed Jucker, Cincinnati
 UPI Coach of the Year: Ed Jucker, Cincinnati

Other major awards 

 Robert V. Geasey Trophy (Top player in Philadelphia Big 5): Wali Jones, Villanova, & Jim Lynam, Saint Joseph's
 NIT/Haggerty Award (Top player in New York City metro area): Barry Kramer, NYU

Coaching changes 

A number of teams changed coaches during the season and after it ended.

References